Milan Králíček (born 18 July 2001) is a Czech footballer who currently plays as a forward for Slovan Liberec.

Career statistics

Club

Notes

References

2001 births
Living people
Czech footballers
Czech Republic youth international footballers
Association football forwards
FC Hradec Králové players
FC Slovan Liberec players
Czech First League players